Forbidden Broadway is an Off-Broadway revue parodying musical theatre, particularly Broadway musicals. It was conceived, written and directed by Gerard Alessandrini.

The original version of the revue opened on January 15, 1982, at Palsson's Supper Club in New York City and ran for 2,332 performances. Alessandrini has rewritten the show more than a dozen times over the years to include parodies of newer shows. In the original iteration of the show, Alessandrini was one of the original actors alongside the actress Nora Mae Lyng, whom Alessandrini said he "created it for.". Michael Chapman directed and produced. In 1982, Jeff Martin succeeded Chapman as director. Alessandrini assumed the directing position subsequently, with Phillip George, Alessandrini's long-time collaborator, co-directing or directing all of the editions of the revue since 2004.

The show, in its various editions, received over 9,000 performances by 2009 and has been seen in more than 200 U.S. cities as well as playing in London, Tokyo, Singapore and Sydney.

Description
The show is a cabaret revue sharply spoofing show tunes, characters and plots of contemporary and current Broadway musicals. Forbidden Broadway and its many sequels have mocked popular shows like The Phantom of the Opera, Wicked, Les Misérables, The Lion King, Spamalot, Annie, Spider-Man: Turn Off the Dark, Rent and Newsies. The revue also targets famous Broadway actors, writers, composers, directors, choreographers and producers, including Julie Andrews, Mel Brooks, Carol Channing, Kristin Chenoweth, Michael Crawford, Harvey Fierstein, Bob Fosse, Whoopi Goldberg, Robert Goulet, Jerry Herman, Dustin Hoffman, Elton John, Angela Lansbury, Andrew Lloyd Webber, Patti LuPone, Cameron Mackintosh, Mary Martin, Ethel Merman, Liza Minnelli, Rita Moreno, Mandy Patinkin, Bernadette Peters, Chita Rivera, Stephen Sondheim, Barbra Streisand, Julie Taymor and Gwen Verdon.

Forbidden Broadway is performed as a four or five-person show, with two men, two women, and most recently, a teen, and piano accompaniment. Forbidden Broadway has released more than a dozen albums, as well as one entitled Forbidden Hollywood, a cast album of the show of the same title by Alessandrini. Like Forbidden Broadway, Forbidden Hollywood is made up of parodies, except that it targets movies rather than musicals. The New York and Los Angeles-based companies of both Forbidden incarnations have served as a workshop for rising talent to hone their skills. Alumni include Jason Alexander, Brad Oscar, Christine Pedi, Bryan Batt, Michael McGrath, Chloe Webb, Barbara Walsh, Ann Morrison, and many more.

In 2006, the show and Alessandrini were awarded Tony Honors for Excellence in Theatre. It has been nominated five times for the Drama Desk Award for Outstanding Revue, winning three times (2001, 2005 and 2008). It also won Drama Desk Special Awards in 1985 and 2009. Forbidden Broadway Goes to Rehab ended its run Off-Broadway on March 1, 2009. In 2009 a book of "Best of" lyrics and the show's history was published under the title Forbidden Broadway: Behind The Mylar Curtain.

The show, in its various editions through 2009, received over 9,000 performances and been seen in more than 200 U.S. cities as well as in London, Tokyo, Singapore and Adelaide, Australia, where it played for the only time with an orchestra at the 2002 Adelaide Cabaret Festival. A 2009 review of the London production, in Britain's The Independent, commented: "Actors have always poked fun at the foibles of commercial theatre. ... Usually, though, they keep their parodies to themselves.  It takes a touch of genius to turn them into something saleable, but writer Gerald Alessandrini has that Midas touch."  The original artwork advertising the show was designed by caricaturist Ken Fallin, who suggested the actors find the name "Nina" written on their bodies as an homage to Al Hirschfeld, who was known for working his daughter's name into his drawings.

A 2012/13 version of the show, Forbidden Broadway: Alive and Kicking!, played in New York and was revived in 2014. Another Off-Broadway version, Forbidden Broadway Comes Out Swinging, played in 2014 at the Davenport Theatre. A London edition in 2014 began at the Menier Chocolate Factory and transferred to the Vaudeville Theatre, starring Christina Bianco, Anna-Jane Casey, Damian Humbley and Ben Lewis, with Phillip George directing. In 2019, Forbidden Broadway Salutes Carol Channing played a celebration show for the late Carol Channing in New York. A brand new Off-Broadway edition, Forbidden Broadway: The Next Generation, is currently playing in New York City at the York Theatre.

Forbidden Broadway: The Next Generation began previews on September 18, 2019 and opened on October 16, 2019 at New York's The Triad Theatre. The show was conceived, created and written by Alessandrini and was directed by Alessandrini. Forbidden Broadway: The Next Generation closed at The Triad on December 1, 2019. The show did a special limited engagement at the Kravis Center in West Palm Beach, FL from December 27–31, 2019. On January 15, 2020, Forbidden Broadway: The Next Generation resumed performances Off-Broadway at The York Theatre Company at Saint Peter's in New York.

The plays and musicals parodied in Forbidden Broadway: The Next Generation include Dear Evan Hansen, Moulin Rouge!, Tootsie, The Ferryman, Hadestown, Fiddler on the Roof, Harry Potter and the Cursed Child, Oklahoma, Mary Poppins, The Prom, and Fosse/Verdon. The personalities portrayed include Lin-Manuel Miranda, Judy Garland, Billy Porter and Harold Prince.

Editions of Forbidden Broadway
Forbidden Broadway (May 4, 1982 – August 30, 1987)
Forbidden Broadway 1988/1989 (September 15, 1988 – December 24, 1989)
Forbidden Broadway 1990 (January 23, 1990 – June 9, 1991)
Forbidden Broadway 1991½ (June 20, 1991 – January 12, 1992)
Forbidden Broadway 1992 (April 6, 1992 – November 30, 1992)
Forbidden Broadway Featuring Forbidden Christmas (December 1, 1992 – December 27, 1992)
Forbidden Broadway 1993 (January 12, 1993 – September 19, 1993)
Forbidden Broadway 1994 (November 11, 1993 – January 2, 1994)
Forbidden Broadway Strikes Back (October 17, 1996 – September 20, 1998) (won Drama Desk Award for Outstanding Lyrics; nominated for the Drama Desk Award for Outstanding Revue)
Forbidden Broadway Cleans Up Its Act (November 17, 1998 – August 30, 2000) (nominated for Drama Desk Award for Outstanding Revue)
Forbidden Broadway 2001: A Spoof Odyssey (December 6, 2000 – 2001) (won Drama Desk Award for Outstanding Revue)
Forbidden Broadway 20th Anniversary Celebration (May 10, 2001 – 2004)
Forbidden Broadway Summer Shock! (July 5, 2004 – September 15, 2004)
Forbidden Broadway: Special Victims Unit (December 16, 2004 – April 15, 2007) (won Drama Desk Award for Outstanding Revue)
Forbidden Broadway: The Roast of Utopia (June 13, 2007 – August 22, 2007)
Forbidden Broadway: Rude Awakening (October 2, 2007 – March 24, 2008) (won Drama Desk Award for Outstanding Revue)
Forbidden Broadway Dances With the Stars! (June 28, 2008 – September 2008)
Forbidden Broadway Goes to Rehab (September 17, 2008 – March 1, 2009)
Forbidden Broadway: Alive and Kicking! (July 24, 2012 – April 28, 2013)
Forbidden Broadway Comes Out Swinging (February 22, 2014 – July 20, 2014)
Forbidden Broadway: West End (September 9, 2014 – November 22, 2014)
Forbidden Broadway: The Next Generation (September 18, 2019 – present)

Albums
 Forbidden Broadway, Vol. 1 – 1984
 Forbidden Broadway, Vol. 2 – 1991
 Forbidden Broadway, Vol. 3 – 1994
 Forbidden Hollywood – 1995
 Forbidden Broadway Strikes Back – 1996
 Forbidden Broadway Cleans Up Its Act – 1999
 Forbidden Broadway: 20th Anniversary Edition – 2000
 Forbidden Broadway 2001: A Spoof Odyssey – 2001
 Forbidden Broadway: Special Victims Unit – 2005
 Forbidden Broadway: Rude Awakening – 2008
 Forbidden Broadway Goes to Rehab – 2009
 Forbidden Broadway: Alive & Kicking! – 2012
 Forbidden Broadway Comes Out Swinging! – 2014
 Forbidden Broadway: The Next Generation! – 2020

See also
Spamilton (2016–2017)
Forbidden Hollywood

References

External links
ForbiddenBroadway.com
Interview with Gerard Alessandrini for MusicalTalk Podcast
 Forbidden Broadway (various versions) at Internet off-Broadway Database

1982 musicals
Off-Broadway musicals
Musical parodies
Revues